Boxwood may refer to:
Buxus, a genus of about 70 species of shrubs and trees in the family Buxaceæ, called "boxwood" in North America, but just "box" in the majority of English-speaking countries (though its wood is "boxwood").
Buxus sempervirens, the most common species of Buxus, and the only one called "boxwood" in United Kingdom
Boxwood (Murfreesboro, Tennessee), a Greek Revival house built in 1840
Boxwood (Talladega, Alabama), listed on the National Register of Historic Places in Talladega County, Alabama

See also
Cornus florida or false boxwood, a species of dogwood (not a true boxwood)
Boxwood Hall, the Elizabeth, New Jersey, home of Elias Boudinot from 1772 to 1795 
Boxwood Public School, a school in Markham, Ontario